George William Cronyn (July 12, 1888 – May 1969) was a writer in the United States. He was involved with the Works Project Administration's Federal Writers Project as assistant to the project's founder, Henry Alsberg. He compiled an anthology of Native American poetry. He also wrote books on Communism and Peire Vidal.

Bibliography
Poems (1914)
The sandbar queen; a play in one act (1918)
The path on the rainbow, an anthology of songs and chants from the Indians of North America (1918)
Death in Fever Flat: a plan (1920)
Native American Poetry
The Fool of Venus: The Story of Piere Vidal
Fortune and Men's Eyes (1935)
Mermaid Tavern, Kit Marlowe's story (1937)
A Primer on Communism (1957)

References

1888 births
1969 deaths
20th-century American male writers
20th-century American novelists
20th-century American poets
Works Progress Administration workers
American male novelists
American male poets